The 1934 New Jersey gubernatorial election was held on November 6, 1934. Republican nominee Harold G. Hoffman narrowly defeated Democratic nominee William L. Dill with 49.90% of the vote.

Republican primary

Candidates
Robert Carey, reformist Jersey City judge and candidate for Governor in 1928 and 1931
Harold G. Hoffman, former U.S. Representative from South Amboy
Emerson Lewis Richards, State Senator from Atlantic County since 1923
Joseph G. Wolber, State Senator from Essex County since 1927

Results

Democratic primary

Candidates
William L. Dill, nominee for Governor in 1928
Theron McCampbell, Assemblyman from Holmdel

Results

General election

Candidates
George E. Bopp, Socialist Labor
Morris M. Brown, Communist 
William L. Dill, Democratic
Cornell J. Grossman, Independent
Harold G. Hoffman, Republican
Charles H. Ingersoll, Independent
Leslie E. Molineaux, Prohibition
Herman F. Niessner, Socialist

Results

References

1934
New Jersey
Gubernatorial
November 1934 events